The 2017 Jacksonville Sharks season was the eighth season for the professional indoor football franchise and first in the National Arena League (NAL).  The Sharks were one of eight teams that competed in the NAL for its inaugural 2017 season

The Sharks played their home games at the Jacksonville Veterans Memorial Arena. Led by head coach Mark Stoute, the Sharks went undefeated through eight games and then Stoute was fired. Siaha Burley was immediately hired as his replacement after serving as the offensive coordinator of the Arena Football League's Cleveland Gladiators.

Standings

Schedule

Regular season
The 2017 regular season schedule was released on December 9, 2016

Key: 

All start times are local time

Postseason

Roster

References

Jacksonville Sharks
Jacksonville Sharks seasons
Jacksonville Sharks